Haradhan Roy (born 16 March 1926, date of death unknown) was an Indian politician belonging to the Communist Party of India (Marxist). He was elected to the Lok Sabha, lower house of the Parliament of India from Asansol in 1989,1991 and 1996 but later sidelined due to differences of opinion with CPI Marxist leadership and was denied a Lok Sabha ticket in 1998. Earlier he was member of the West Bengal Legislative Assembly. Roy is deceased.

References

External links
  Official biographical sketch in Parliament of India website

1926 births
Year of death missing
Communist Party of India (Marxist) politicians from West Bengal
People from Asansol
India MPs 1989–1991
India MPs 1991–1996
India MPs 1996–1997
Lok Sabha members from West Bengal